Central Dusun, also known as Bunduliwan, is one of the more widespread languages spoken by the Dusun (including Kadazan) peoples of Sabah, Malaysia.

Kadazandusun language standardisation 

What is termed as Central Dusun (or simply Dusun) and Coastal Kadazan (or simply Kadazan) are deemed to be highly mutually intelligible to one other; many consider these to be part of a single language.

Under the efforts of the Kadazandusun Cultural Association Sabah, in 1995, the central Bundu-Liwan dialect was selected to serve as the basis for a standardised "Kadazandusun" language. This dialect, spoken in the Bundu and Liwan valleys of the Crocker Range (now parts of the present-day districts of Ranau, Tambunan and Keningau), was selected as it was deemed to be the most mutually intelligible when conversing with other "Dusun" or "Kadazan" dialects.

Alphabet and pronunciation
Dusun is written using the Latin alphabet using 22 characters (the letters C, E, F, Q, and X are used in loanwords):

A B D G H I K L M N O P R S T U V W Y Z

These characters together are called Pimato.

Consonants 

Semivowels  and rhotic  only occur in most of the other dialects of the Dusun/Kadazan languages.

Vowels
The vowels are divided into:

Simple vowels: 

Diphthongs:   (sometimes pronounced )   

Some combinations of vowels do not form diphthongs and each vowel retains its separate sound:     . In some words  is not a diphthong, and this is indicated by an apostrophe between the two vowels: .

Grammar

Personal pronouns
Tindal Dusun has a Philippine-type focus system of syntax that makes one particular noun phrase in a sentence the most prominent. This prominent, focused noun phrase does not need to be the subject or the agent of the clause. In clauses with pronouns, the verbal morphology and the pronoun both indicate focus. If the verb carries actor focus morphology, the actor of the clause will therefore be a nominative pronoun (or, rarely, an emphatic pronoun). Any other noun phrase in the clause will necessarily take pronouns from a different set, as only one noun phrase can be in focus in any given clause.

Sentence structure
A typical Dusun sentence is VSO.

It is, however, possible for a grammatically-correct Dusun sentence to be SVO.

Vocabulary

To form numbers such as fifty or sixty, a multiplier is combined with a positional unit (tens, hundreds, thousands etc), using .

The Dusun name of the months derive from the traditional cycle of paddy harvesting.

The names for the days of the week are mostly based on a simple numerical sequence, which is commonly used for media and newspapers. The names of Dusun days as part of the seven-day week derive from the life cycle of a butterfly.

Examples

1 1  2  3  4  5

Austronesian languages comparison table

Below is a table of Dusun and other Austronesian languages comparing thirteen words.

References

External links

 Kadazandusun Language Foundation
 Kadazandusun Online Vocabulary Sharing
 Numbers in Dusun (Dynamic)
 Collection of Central Dusun sentences at tatoeba.org
 Collection of Central Dusun sentences with audio at tatoeba.org

Dusunic languages
Dusun
Verb–subject–object languages
Dusun